Khvan (also Romanized as Khvān; also known as Khūy and Kūh) is a village in Qohestan Rural District, Qohestan District, Darmian County, South Khorasan Province, Iran. At the 2006 census, its population was 375, in 126 families.

References 

Populated places in Darmian County